The Shanghai–Woosung or Songhu railway was a standard-gauge railway in Shanghai, China. It was opened on September 1, AD 1898, and ran between the Old North Railway Station in the modern city's Zhabei District and Woosung in the modern Baoshan District.

It is sometimes conflated with the earlier Woosung Road, whose route it principally shared. That railway had been purchased from its foreign ownersprincipally the British firm Jardine, Matheson, & Companyin 1876 and dismantled for reuse in the Taiwanese coal fields. Sheng Xuanhuai established a new railroad generally along the same path as the old one, although the station was moved over a few streets to the Old North Station. The Songhu was also extended north into Woosung proper and additional stations opened.

The line was badly damaged during World War II. The route was eventually incorporated in the Shanghai Metro's Line 3. The former North Station is now the site of the Shanghai Railway Museum and another memorial was placed at the site of the former terminus beside Line 3's Songbin Road station.

See also
 History of rail transport in China
 Woosung railway
 History of Shanghai
 List of railways in China

Notes

References

Railway lines in China
Rail transport in Shanghai
History of rail transport in China